The W.T. Ford House is a historic residence located south of Earlham, Iowa, United States. This early example of a vernacular limestone farmhouse was built in three parts. The first section of the house is attributed to George Francis, who was one of the first settlers in the township.  This 1½-story section is composed of rubble limestone.  The first addition was built onto the south side of the original house.  It is also 1½-stories and it is composed of locally quarried finished cut and ashlar limestone.  Most of the main facade of this addition has a full sized enclosed stucco porch.

W.T. Ford bought the property in 1868 from Francis and had the second addition built to the west of the first addition.  It is 2½-stories and is composed of ashlar and rubble stone that was quarried at Eureka Quarry in Madison Township.  The quarry's owner, J.G Parkins, is credited with building this addition.  He may have built the first addition as well.  All three sections of the house are capped with gable roofs, and the two additions feature bracketed eaves.  Ford was a major player in the area owning , and with his partners, farmed .  The house was listed on the National Register of Historic Places in 1987.

References

Houses completed in 1870
Vernacular architecture in Iowa
Houses in Madison County, Iowa
National Register of Historic Places in Madison County, Iowa
Houses on the National Register of Historic Places in Iowa